David Downs Hartman (born May 19, 1935) is an American journalist and media host who began his media career as an actor. He currently anchors and hosts documentary programs on History and PBS. Hartman is best known as the first host of ABC's Good Morning America, from 1975 to 1987. As an actor, he starred in the 1970s as a young resident, Dr. Paul Hunter, on The Bold Ones: The New Doctors and as a teacher in the series Lucas Tanner. He acted in the 1973 TV movie remake of Miracle on 34th Street.

Early life
Hartman was born in Pawtucket, Rhode Island, the son of Fannie Rodman (Downs) and Cyril Baldwin Hartman. He is of part German descent. Hartman attended Mount Hermon School (now Northfield Mount Hermon) and was geared toward professional baseball in high school. However, he turned down a baseball scholarship to attend Duke University, where he majored in economics and became a member of the Sigma Chi fraternity and Alpha Kappa Psi business fraternity. After college, he served three years of active duty as an officer in the U.S. Air Force, Strategic Air Command. He was a supply officer at Dow AFB in Bangor, Maine, and acted in local musicals there, including Oklahoma!, in the role of Curly. David spent the summer of 1960 at the Surflight Summer Theatre in Beach Haven, New Jersey, and had lead roles in Mister Roberts, South Pacific, and Kismet.

Acting career (1964–1975)
Hartman appeared in two Broadway shows; the original Hello, Dolly! in 1964, and The Yearling (1965). After working in films such as the Doris Day comedyThe Ballad of Josie (1967), Nobody's Perfect (1968), and Did You Hear the One About the Traveling Saleslady? (1968) with Phyllis Diller, he refocused on television. He appeared in The Virginian in 1969 and won attention as a dedicated doctor on The Bold Ones: The New Doctors, earning a nomination for a Golden Globe award.  Hartman played a lead role alongside Hal Linden in the industrial musical Diesel Dazzle (1966).

Hartman also appeared as the character David Sutton in more than two dozen episodes of the television series The Virginian and guest-starred on several other popular TV series such as Marcus Welby, M.D.; The Name of the Game; Ironside; and The Carol Burnett Show. In 1970, Hartman appeared in the made-for-TV pilot film for San Francisco International as an embittered pilot whose wife was held hostage by criminals. In 1973 he starred in Miracle on 34th Street, a TV remake of the holiday classic, along with Jane Alexander and Sebastian Cabot. The next year he starred in the Disney movie The Island at the Top of the World as an archaeology professor.

On the 1974-75 NBC series Lucas Tanner, Hartman played a retired baseball player turned unconventional high-school teacher. The cancellation of this series marked the end of his acting career.

News and broadcasting career (1975–present)
On November 3, 1975, Hartman became the original male co-host of ABC's renamed morning news show, Good Morning America (1975–1987). During his 11 years as a co-host, GMA would often be the highest-rated morning news program on network television. Although Hartman did not have a journalism background, he professionally conducted more than 12,000 interviews during his time on the show.

Hartman usually closed each Good Morning America broadcast with the same benediction: "Make it a good day today." In a statement that Hartman prepared for the 30th anniversary GMA broadcast in 2005, he explained, "My daily sign-off line, 'Make it a good day today,' reflected 'GMA's' values and the belief that each of us can affect our lives in a positive way, that our program was, we hoped, a public service."

Hartman has been an anchor and host of a series of documentaries on the Discovery Channel and PBS member station WNET in New York City. Produced by James Nicoloro, the PBS documentaries are a series of "Walk Through" documentaries about various communities around New York City, which include A Walk Down 42nd Street (August 1998), A Walk Up Broadway (March 1999), A Walk Through Harlem (December 1999), A Walk Around Brooklyn with David Hartman and Historian Barry Lewis (2000), A Walk Through Greenwich Village (2001), A Walk Through Central Park (2001), A Walk Through Newark (2002), A Walk Through Hoboken (2003), A Walk Through Queens (2004), A Walk Through the Bronx (2005), and A Walk Around Staten Island (2007).

In North Carolina, Hartman is also heard on North Carolina Public Radio and WCPE-FM as host of the North Carolina Symphony radio broadcasts. For the television documentaries he has done, Hartman would win several Emmy and journalist awards.

Hartman was the 2017 recipient of the National Association of Broadcasters Distinguished Service Award.

Personal life
Hartman was married to Maureen Downey from 1974 until her death on September 17, 1997. In 2001, he married Mary Clark Putman, a widowed homemaker. He has four children from his first marriage.

Filmography

References

External links
 
 
 
 David Hartman at Internet Off-Broadway Database

American male film actors
American male television actors
American television news anchors
1935 births
Living people
ABC News personalities
American people of German descent
Duke University Trinity College of Arts and Sciences alumni
People from Pawtucket, Rhode Island
United States Air Force officers
20th-century American journalists
American male journalists
21st-century American journalists
Northfield Mount Hermon School alumni